The Aston Martin Valhalla is an upcoming sports car developed by British manufacturer Aston Martin in collaboration with Red Bull Racing. The mid-engined car has a  plug-in hybrid powertrain and is meant to sit below the flagship Valkyrie track-focused sports car and is intended to be more usable as an everyday car.

Overview 
The car is a result of the collaboration between Aston Martin and Red Bull Racing. Initially called AM-RB 003, the project name for the car was revealed to be the "Son of Valkyrie" at the car's public introduction as it uses many technologies first implemented in the Valkyrie. The final name of the car was revealed to be Valhalla. Namewise, the Valhalla follows numerous previous Aston Martin models tradition of starting with the letter "V". Like the Valkyrie, the name "Valhalla" also has its origin in Norse mythology.

The concept's aero design was a unique FlexFoil rear wing. The wing could change the car's downforce without changing its angle of attack; it is integrated into the bodywork and is claimed to generate no drag or aerodynamic turbulence.

The concept's interior has space for storing luggage behind the seats, a centre console and a phone mount for the driver. The car shares the race-inspired steering wheel from the Valkyrie and features unique wing shaped paddle shifters on the steering column. The car also has dihedral doors for easy entry and exit. As of July 2021, the production vehicle's interior had not been publicly revealed.

The chassis is a variation of the carbon fibre monocoque chassis of the Valkyrie with the body panels being produced from the same material. The chassis will be produced by Aston Martin while the aerodynamic body panels will be produced at Red Bull Racing.

When initially announced, the car was planned to use a 3.0L twin-turbocharged V6 engine as opposed to the V12 on the Valkyrie but would share the KERS system from the flagship sports car. The engine was intended to be designed and developed in-house by the company and will use the Castrol Nexcel 90-second oil change system first used in the track-only Vulcan. The car is the first road car to use such a system. The exhaust system uses dual outlets which are placed on top of the car, similar to the Porsche 918 Spyder. However, in July 2021, the Valhalla's production form debuted and featured an extensive redesign from the concept form, including switching engines from the in-house V6 to the Mercedes-AMG M178 LS2 4.0-liter twin-turbocharged V8 in conjunction with two electric motors, among many other changes. The new powertrain will develop .

Production 
The car is planned to enter production in 2023. It was originally slated for a limited production run of 500 examples starting at $1,000,000. However, as of August 2021, the Valhalla will be limited to 999 examples with an estimated price of US$800,000 (GB£580,000).

Appearances in media 
The Valhalla appears briefly, sitting in a wind tunnel at Q-Branch in the James Bond film No Time to Die, though the vehicle itself is not used.

See also 
 List of production cars by power output

References

External links 

 

Valhalla
Cars introduced in 2019
2020s cars
Sports cars
Rear mid-engine, all-wheel-drive vehicles
Hybrid electric cars
Plug-in hybrid vehicles
Partial zero-emissions vehicles